Isensua is a UK vodka firm that produces a range of vodkas and PPS beverages in the United Kingdom, as well as being the European importer for Russian Standard Vodka. The firm is also known for producing a vodka called Opium on the British market.

Range
 Isensua Vodka
 Isensua Opium
 Isensua VX Concord Grape and Passion Fruit (PPS) 
 Isensua VX White Cranberry and Lychee (PPS) 
 Isensua VX Dragon Fruit and Guava (PPS)

External links
 Isensua 

British vodkas
Drink companies of the United Kingdom